Amphicallia bellatrix is a moth of the subfamily Arctiinae first described by Johan Wilhelm Dalman in 1823. It is found in Kenya, Malawi, Mozambique, South Africa, Tanzania, Uganda and Zambia.

The larvae feed on Pinus patula and Crotalaria species.

References

Moths described in 1823
Arctiini
Lepidoptera of Uganda
Lepidoptera of Mozambique
Lepidoptera of Malawi
Lepidoptera of Tanzania
Moths of Sub-Saharan Africa